Carlos Sánchez (born 9 January 1952) is a Cuban water polo player. He competed in the men's tournament at the 1972 Summer Olympics.

References

External links
 

1952 births
Living people
Cuban male water polo players
Olympic water polo players of Cuba
Water polo players at the 1972 Summer Olympics
Place of birth missing (living people)